UFO is a 1976 board wargame published by Gamma Two Games. It is a game in which, in the near future, Earthmen are defending their homeworld against invasion by flying saucers.

Reception
Norman S. Howe reviewed U. F. O. in The Space Gamer No. 16. Howe reviewed both UFO and Starwars and commented that "They are attractively packaged and illustrated, and are made of sturdy materials. These are ideal games to play when you are too dazed to continue with War in the Pacific, or can't bear the sound of the pencils in Stellar Conquest."

References

Board games introduced in 1976